Erfan Hajrasooli, known professionally as Erfan Paydar, is an Iranian rapper, songwriter, producer, and label owner. He is one of the pioneers of Persian Rap. Erfan's "Az Khaneh Ta Goor" (Persian: از خانه تا گور) was the one of the first professionally produced Iranian rap albums, released by a major record label. He is nicknamed as "Sun of Persian rap” (Persian: خورشید رپ پارس) by his fans. He is the founder of the label Paydar. He has a collaboration with Yas. His views are a result of his personal experiences and that is reflected in his poems. His songs provide a mixture of commentary on daily life as well politics, poetry, and social issues.

In addition to Az Khaneh Ta Goor, Erfan has, to date, released three more albums including, Hamishegi, Khodafezi and Ayatoltrap (with Gdaal) and Angizeh accompanied by Dara Paydar.

Erfan took a hiatus from music for two years following the of release Khodafezi. According to Erfan, the reasons for his farewell are fully stated in this album. Then, in 2018, he made his return with the release of the single "Khosh Oomadi" featuring Canis.

In addition to music, Erfan has worked in other fields including directing, photography, podcast production (Nomadland Podcast), establishing real estate Paydar Fit and Cuché sustainable apparel brands.

Biography

Life and career
Erfan was born in Isfahan, Iran, on 3 August 1983. He ended his career after the "Khodahafezi" (meaning Goodbye) album was released in 2016 but he returned to Iranian hip-hop in 2018 with the single song "Khosh Omadi" (meaning welcome back).

Work to date 
He released his debut album Az Khaneh Ta Goor (From the Cradle to the Grave) in 2007. Erfan's focus on his first album was to introduce Iranian hip hop to a wider audience and detail some of his frustrations with Iranian music. The album was named after a poem by Molaana Rumi about death. The album encompasses some of his thoughts as a traveling immigrant from his home country Iran. On 1 September 2011 Erfan released the single, 'Donya Male Maast" featuring Sami Beigi, produced and composed by Los Angeles-based composer/producer Naveed Dezfoli.

Az Khaneh Ta Goor (2007)
On 24 July 2007, Erfan released his first album. Earlier events had provided inspiration for Erfan's first album. Erfan was briefly arrested and jailed in 2002. "Sad Ghasam" was featured on Erfan's debut album, Az Khaneh Ta Goor.

Musical style and influence
Erfan has said that "many old school/new school musicians and many old school/new school Iranian poets" have influenced him in his style. In his interview with Radio Javan he names some of his influences as traditional Iranian poets such as Omar Khayyam, Hafez and Saddi Shirazi and more recent Iranian poets such as Sohrab Sepehri and Parvin E'tesami. He also mentions traditional Iranian music and names singers Dariush and Googoosh as well as American rappers Tupac Shakur, Nas and Mos Def.

Social causes 
In 2007, he collaborated on a public service announcement for the Persian American Cancer Institute. In July 2009, following the Post 2009 election events in Iran, he released a song called Tasmim (Decision) about the events of the election in which he expressed sorrow, frustration, and a request for the movement to continue. He continued supporting the Green Movement of Iran on his Facebook page.

Albums
Az Khaneh Ta Goor (2007)
Hamishegi (2010)
Khodafezi (2016)
Ayatol Trap (2018) 
Angizeh (2020)
Nur(2022)

References

External links
 

1983 births
Living people
Iranian hip hop musicians
Iranian rappers
Musicians from Isfahan
21st-century Iranian male singers